Juan Procopio de Bassecourt Thieulaine y Bryas López de Ochoa, (22 April 1740 – 12 April 1820) was Baron of Maials, Count of Santa Clara an office he assumed before the Spanish Cession enacted by the Adams-Onís Treaty of 1819, Captain General of Cuba, (6 December 1796 - 13 May 1799) and Captain General of Catalonia (14 May 1802 - 1808). While he was Captain General of Cuba he was responsible for the construction or improvement of numerous fortifications in Havana, including the Santa Clara Battery.

Birth
Juan Procopio Bassecourt y Bryas was born the son of Procopio Francisco de Bassecourt y Thieulaine, a Field Marshal of the Royal Spanish Army, Marquis of Bassecourt, as well as Count of Santa Clara (a noble title granted in 1748 by King Fernando VI of Spain, the family having served imperial Spain since at least the middle of the 16th century), Baron of Maials, and Governor of Lerida, and of Ignés de Bryas, described in some papers and documents as Inés María de Bryas y López de Ochoa.
 

He was the nephew of Maria Catalina de Bassecourt, who married the Palermo-born Spanish military officer Juan Gonzalez-Valor, Marquis of Gonzalez since 1736, a title awarded in 1736  by Charles VII of Naples and Sicily, King of Naples and Sicily 1716–1736, later King Charles III of Spain (1759-1788).

Personal life
He married in Barcelona Maria Teresa de Sentmenat y Copons, a niece of  the Marquis of Sentmenat and  Marquis of Castelldefels, (title granted 6 April 1696 by King Carlos II of Spain), descending from a Catalan family from Mallorca and Barcelona, known since the 12th century, granddaughter of the Spanish ambassador in France since 1698 to the court of Louis XIV of France, and the Viceroy of Peru, Manuel de Oms y de Santa Pau, (Barcelona, 1651 – Lima, Peru – 24 April 1710).

References

External links
Web.archive.org
Asasve.es
Cubagenweb.org
Website on Irish immigration in Latin America

Bibliography
Prof. John  Jay TePaske (1929–2007). The Governorship of Spanish Florida, 1700-1763 (Durham: Duke University Press, (1964), 248 pages. ASIN: B0007DN7VE

Spanish generals
Governors of Cuba
Governors of Louisiana
Governors of Florida
Cuban nobility
1740 births
1820 deaths
Counts of Spain
Spanish colonial governors and administrators
18th-century Cuban people